Persian Bible Dictionary is a reference of Bible names in the Persian language. Author of the work was James W. Hawkes.

References

Persian dictionaries
Iranian books